Carlos Cárdenas Rodriguez (born October 5, 1976 in Cobija, Pando) is a Bolivian retired football striker.

Club career
During his professional career he played for Wilstermann, Blooming, Aurora and Universitario.

International career
Nicknamed El Pollo (The Chicken), Cárdenas capped for the Bolivia national team 5 times between 1999 and 2001.

References

External links
 
 

1976 births
Living people
People from Cobija
Bolivian footballers
Bolivia international footballers
Association football forwards
C.D. Jorge Wilstermann players
Club Blooming players
Club Aurora players
Universitario de Sucre footballers
Chaco Petrolero players